Yannick Toapri Boli (born 13 January 1988) is a French professional footballer who plays as a forward.

His previous clubs include Paris Saint-Germain, Le Havre, Nîmes and Bulgarian Chernomorets. He is the nephew of former France national team player Basile Boli and Lens striker Roger Boli.

Career

Club
Born in Saint-Maur-des-Fossés, Boli began his playing career with Ligue 1 side PSG, joining them when he was eleven years old.

He was part of the side's B team from 2005–07. In 2006, he helped their under-18s side to win the French Under-18 Championship and in his last season, he was a top scorer.

On 6 May 2008, he scored a 77th-minute winner against Ligue 2 side Amiens SC, in the semi-finals of the Coupe de France to send PSG into the final, where he was an unused substitute as they lost 1–0 to Lyon. On playing for PSG, Boli said, "PSG are the club of my dreams and I joined when I was 11. The fact that I'm now playing here with the first team gives me immense pride."

Boli was loaned to newly promoted Ligue 1 side Le Havre AC on  18 October 2008 until the end of the 2008–09 season, making his debut seven days later in a 2–1 home win over Valenciennes at Stade Jules Deschaseaux. He made a total of eleven league appearances, before returning to PSG in July 2009.

On 19 August 2009, Boli joined English Championship side Blackpool on trial, with Sky Sports reporting that he could be about to sign a one-year loan deal with the Seasiders. Boli said, "I am happy to be here in England, hopefully it (the move) will happen for me." The Blackpool Gazette then claimed it was unlikely Boli would sign, however The Times reported that he was expected to move to Blackpool on loan after a medical planned for 24 August.

In September 2011, Boli joined London based football agency Pro Sports Agency. 
He signed with Bulgarian A PFG club Chernomorets Burgas in February 2012 after a one-week trial period.

On 18 February 2013, he was sold to Ukrainian side Zorya Luhansk for a fee of 300.000 €. He signed a two-year contract.

On 29 August 2014, Boli was announced as an Anzhi Makhachkala player, signing a four-year contract. In November 2014, Boli was awarded Best Goal of the month and awarded the 1FNL Best Players on the Football National League official website.

After joining the club, managed by Sergei Tashuyev, Boli was introduced very slowly into the starting lineup. On his first game against SKA-Energia, he came on as a substitute player for just on 28 minutes.

He has scored 26 goals in 62 appearances for the Dagestan based FC Anzhi Makhachkala.

On 16 January 2017, Boli signed a two and half years contract with UAE Arabian Gulf League club Al Ain FC. On 18 January 2017, Al Ain decided to void the contract after "additional demands were made by Anzhi and Boli".

On 24 February 2017, Boli joined Chinese side Dalian Yifang, and scored 16 goals to promote the team to 2018 Chinese Super League.
 
On 15 March 2018, Boli signed a one-year deal with Major League Soccer side Colorado Rapids.

Boli joined Thai League 1 club Ratchaburi Mitr Phol F.C. in the 2019 season. He scored a debut hat-trick on 22 February 2019.

International
Boli holds dual French and Ivorian nationality. In 2008, ahead of the Summer Olympics in China, he chose to represent the Ivory Coast. "I'm lucky enough to have dual Franco-Ivorian nationality and I'm proud of my African roots," he said. "I've followed the Elephants a lot in the last few years and I feel there's an interesting situation there. Because of that, I didn't hesitate in choosing that country's shirt." In March 2008, he was called up by manager Gérard Gili to the Ivory Coast Olympics team.

Personal life
Yannick is the oldest brother of Kévin Boli and nephew of former Marseille and French international defender Basile Boli, and former Lens striker Roger Boli.

Career statistics

Club

Honours
Dalian Yifang
China League One: 2017

References

External links
 
 
 Yannick Boli on Eurosport
 

1988 births
Living people
Sportspeople from Saint-Maur-des-Fossés
Association football forwards
Citizens of Ivory Coast through descent
Ivorian footballers
Ivory Coast international footballers
French footballers
French sportspeople of Ivorian descent
Footballers from Val-de-Marne
Ivorian expatriate footballers
French expatriate footballers
Paris Saint-Germain F.C. players
Le Havre AC players
Nîmes Olympique players
PFC Chernomorets Burgas players
FC Zorya Luhansk players
FC Anzhi Makhachkala players
Dalian Professional F.C. players
Colorado Rapids players
Ligue 1 players
Ligue 2 players
First Professional Football League (Bulgaria) players
Ukrainian Premier League players
Russian Premier League players
China League One players
Expatriate footballers in Bulgaria
Expatriate footballers in Ukraine
Expatriate footballers in Russia
Expatriate footballers in China
Expatriate soccer players in the United States
Major League Soccer players
Boli family
Yannick Boli
Yannick Boli
Yannick Boli
Expatriate footballers in Thailand
Ivorian expatriate sportspeople in Ukraine
Ivorian expatriate sportspeople in Thailand
Ivorian expatriate sportspeople in Russia
Ivorian expatriate sportspeople in Bulgaria
Ivorian expatriate sportspeople in the United States
Ivorian expatriate sportspeople in China
French expatriate sportspeople in Ukraine
French expatriate sportspeople in Thailand
French expatriate sportspeople in Russia
French expatriate sportspeople in Bulgaria
French expatriate sportspeople in the United States
French expatriate sportspeople in China